Tae-young is a Korean unisex given name. Its meaning differs based on the hanja used to write each syllable of the name. There are 20 hanja with the reading "tae" and 34 hanja with the reading "young" on the South Korean government's official list of hanja which may be registered for use in given names.
 
People with this name include:

Entertainers
 Yoon Tae-young (born 1974), South Korean actor
 Ki Tae-young (born Kim Yong-woo, 1978), South Korean actor and singer
 Son Tae-young (born 1980), South Korean actress

Politicians and public policy figures
 Ham Tae-young (1873–1954), leader of the Presbyterian Church of Korea, later a South Korean politician
 Lee Tai-young (1914–1988), South Korea's first female lawyer
 Kim Tae-young (military) (born 1949), South Korean male general, later Minister of Defense

Sportspeople
 Kim Tae-young (footballer, born 1970), South Korean male football left and centre back (K-League Classic)
 Taiei Kin (born 1970), Japanese male kickboxer of Korean descent
 Lee Tea-young (born 1977), South Korean male handball player
 Han Tae-young (born 1979), South Korean male Greco-Roman wrestler
 Yang Tae-young (born 1980), South Korean male gymnast
 Kim Tae-young (footballer, born 1982), South Korean male football defender (Thai League 2)
 Kim Tae-young (footballer, born 1987), South Korean male football midfielder (K-League Challenge)
 Lee Tae-young (born 1987), South Korean male football midfielder (Cambodian League)

See also
 List of Korean given names
 Richard Rutt (1925–2011), English Roman Catholic missionary in South Korea, who used the Korean name No Taeyŏng

References

Korean unisex given names